Ramiro Ernesto Carballo Henríquez (born 16 March 1978 in Colón, La Libertad, El Salvador) is a retired Salvadoran professional football player.

Club career
Ramiro Carballo came through the youth ranks at Alianza and made his professional debut for the club in 1997.

He had a short spell with San Salvador six years later, only to return to Alianza after only one season.

After another four years later he left Alianza for another short stint, with Isidro Metapán. Later joined UES in 2010.

On August 12, 2013, Carballo played his 500th game in the Salvadoran Primera División playing for UES against Isidro Metapán, despite losing 1–0.

He announced his retirement from football on the 5th of August 2017, He played 603 games in the primera division.

International career
Carballo made his debut for El Salvador in an October 1999 CONCACAF Gold Cup qualification match against Canada and has earned a total of 15 caps, scoring no goals.

He has represented his country in 5 FIFA World Cup qualification matches and played at the 2007 CONCACAF Gold Cup.

His final international game was a September 2007 friendly match, against Ecuador.

References

External links

1978 births
Living people
People from La Libertad Department (El Salvador)
Salvadoran footballers
El Salvador international footballers
2003 UNCAF Nations Cup players
2007 CONCACAF Gold Cup players
Alianza F.C. footballers
San Salvador F.C. footballers
A.D. Isidro Metapán footballers
Association football defenders